Australia competed at the 2022 World Aquatics Championships in Budapest, Hungary from 17 June to 3 July.

Medalists

Artistic swimming

Australia's artistic swimming team consisted of 12 athletes (12 female).

Women

 Legend: (R) = Reserve Athlete

Diving

Australia entered 13 divers.
Men

Women

Mixed

Open water swimming

Australia qualified three male and three female open water swimmers.

Men

Women

Mixed

Swimming

Australia entered 35 swimmers.

Men

Women

Mixed

 Legend: (*) = Swimmers who participated in the heat only.

Water polo

Summary

Men's tournament

Team roster

Group play

Playoffs

9th-12th place semifinal

Eleventh place game

Women's tournament

Team roster

Group play

Quarterfinals

5th–8tth place semifinal

Fifth place game

References

World Aquatics Championships
2022
Nations at the 2022 World Aquatics Championships